In Mandaeism, Zartai-Zartanai is a demon in the World of Darkness (alma ḏ-hšuka) or underworld. Hibil Ziwa encounters Zartai-Zartanai during his descent to the World of Darkness in Chapter 1 of Book 5 in the Right Ginza, which mentions Zartai-Zartanai's wife as Amamit (an epithet of Libat, or Venus).

References

Demons in Mandaeism